Maya Rosa Ariana Stefanie (born 17 August 1986) better known as Maya Rosa, is an Indonesian professional tennis player. She made her debut as a professional in 2003, aged 16, at an ITF tournament in Jakarta. In that year, she won gold in the women's doubles, silver in the women's team, and silver in the mixed doubles at the Southeast Asian Games in Ho Chi Minh City.

In her first year of professional competition, she won two ITF doubles titles, at Jakarta and Manila.

Her most recent ITF match was played in 2006.

In 2011, she returned to international competition in a different sport, Soft Tennis. At the 2011 Southeast Asian Games in Palembang, she won two gold medals for Women's Doubles and Women's Team, and one silver medal for Mixed Doubles. Along with partner Prima Simpatiaji, she won the mixed doubles bronze medal in Soft Tennis at the 2014 Asian Games in Incheon.

ITF Finals

Doubles (2–1)

External links

Indonesian female tennis players
1986 births
Living people
Asian Games medalists in soft tennis
Soft tennis players at the 2014 Asian Games
Asian Games bronze medalists for Indonesia
Medalists at the 2014 Asian Games
Southeast Asian Games gold medalists for Indonesia
Southeast Asian Games silver medalists for Indonesia
Southeast Asian Games medalists in tennis
Competitors at the 2003 Southeast Asian Games
Competitors at the 2011 Southeast Asian Games
Southeast Asian Games medalists in soft tennis
People from Wonogiri Regency
21st-century Indonesian women